Results from the 1995 Buenos Aires Grand Prix held at Buenos Aires on April 9, 1995, in the Autódromo Oscar Alfredo Gálvez.The race was the third race for the 1995 Buenos Aires Grand Prix of Formula Three Sudamericana.

Classification 

Buenos Aires Grand Prix
1995 in motorsport
1995 in Argentine motorsport
April 1995 sports events in South America